Kim Hee-jin (born 29 April 1991) is a South Korean volleyball player. She is a member of the South Korea women's national volleyball team at the 2012 Summer Olympics, 2016 Summer Olympics and 2020 Summer Olympics. The team finished at fourth place in 2012, 2020 and fifth in 2016.

Kim has been a member of the Hwaseong IBK Altos since the team's inaugural season, 2010–2011. She was selected with the first overall pick in the NH-Nonghyup V-League 2010-2011 draft by the Altos. She helped her team to the league title and championship title during the 2012–2013 season. In the 2013–2014 season, Kim and her team clinched their second consecutive league title, but lost to the GS Caltex Seoul KIXX in the championship round. In the 2014–2015 season, her team finished second in the league standings but swept the Seongnam Korea Expressway Corporation Hi-pass in the championship round to claim the Altos' second championship title in three years. Kim Hee-jin played a crucial role during the championship round alongside American Destinee Hooker.

On April 13, 2015, Kim Hee-jin was selected to the South Korea women's national volleyball team together with fellow Altos members Park Jeong-ah, Chae Seona, Nam Jiyeon, and Kim Yoori.

Filmography

TV Show
 Omniscient Interfering View - (guest, Ep. 169, 170)
 Breakfast with Tiffany – (guest, Ep. 6, 7)
 Running Man – (guest, Ep. 572, 573, 574)
I live alone - (appearance, Ep 412, 413)
Master In The House - (appearance, Ep. 123)
Brave Single Parenting- Raise on my own - (guest, Ep. 12)

References

External links

Kim Hee-jin at Rio 2016
Kim Hee-jin at FiVB
Kim Hee-jin at KOVO 
Kim Hee-jin at IBK Sports 

1991 births
Living people
South Korean women's volleyball players
Volleyball players at the 2016 Summer Olympics
Volleyball players at the 2012 Summer Olympics
Olympic volleyball players of South Korea
Asian Games medalists in volleyball
Volleyball players at the 2014 Asian Games
Asian Games gold medalists for South Korea
Sportspeople from Busan
Medalists at the 2014 Asian Games
Volleyball players at the 2020 Summer Olympics